The Students of Salamanca is an 1813 comedy play by the British writer Robert Francis Jameson. It was first performed at the Covent Garden Theatre in London. The original cast included John Fawcett and Maria Theresa Kemble.

References

Bibliography
 Nicoll, Allardyce. A History of Early Nineteenth Century Drama 1800-1850. Cambridge University Press, 1930.

1813 plays
West End plays
Comedy plays
Plays by Robert Francis Jameson
Plays set in Spain